This is the list of current presidents of regions of Italy.

List

Presidents
Regional presidents
Regional presidents
 
Italy,regions,presidents